Helmut Lemke (29 September 1907 – 15 April 1990) was a German politician of the NSDAP and CDU, and Minister-President of Schleswig-Holstein (1963–1971). He was born in Kiel and died in Lübeck.

External links 
 

1907 births
1990 deaths
Presidents of the German Bundesrat
Christian Democratic Union of Germany politicians
Members of the Landtag of Schleswig-Holstein
Nazi Party politicians
Politicians from Kiel
People from the Province of Schleswig-Holstein
Ministers-President of Schleswig-Holstein
Ministers of the Schleswig-Holstein State Government